Joseph Baras was a Belgian sport shooter who competed in the early 20th century in rifle shooting, he competed at the 1900 Olympics in Paris.

At the 1900 Summer Olympics, Baras competed in five different rifle shooting events, unfortunately he finished last in four of them and was tied in 28th place in the other.

References

External links

Year of birth missing
Belgian male sport shooters
ISSF rifle shooters
Olympic shooters of Belgium
Shooters at the 1900 Summer Olympics
Year of death missing
Place of birth missing
Place of death missing